Ahmed Salah Said al-Ghamdi (also transliterated as Alghamdi) (July 2, 1979 – September 11, 2001) was one of five terrorist hijackers of United Airlines Flight 175 as part of the September 11 attacks.

Ahmed Al-Ghamdi was born in Saudi Arabia in 1979. He dropped out of school to fight in Chechnya and was probably sent to train in al-Qaeda camps in Afghanistan where he would be chosen by Osama bin Laden to participate in the terrorist attacks in America.

He arrived in the United States in May 2001 on a tourist visa and helped plan out how the attacks would take place. On September 11, 2001, he boarded United Airlines Flight 175 and assisted in the hijacking of the plane so that lead hijacker and trained pilot Marwan al-Shehhi could take over the plane and crash it into the South Tower of the World Trade Center, as part of the coordinated attacks.

Early activities 
An Imam, al-Ghamdi was from the al Bahah Province of Saudi Arabia, a province in the south west of Saudi Arabia. It is the capital of Al Bahah Province nestled between the resorts of Mecca and Abha, Al Bahah is one of the Kingdom’s prime tourist attractions. Al-Ghamdi shared the same tribal affiliation with fellow hijackers Saeed al-Ghamdi, Hamza al-Ghamdi, and Ahmed al-Haznawi. This group is noted as being some of the more religiously observant of the hijackers, and they are thought to have met each other some time in 1999.

Known as al-Jaraah al-Ghamdi during the preparations, the only one of the hijackers to use a variation on his own name, al-Ghamdi quit school to fight in Chechnya against the Russians in 2000, and received a US Visa on September 3 of that year. In November, both he and Salem al-Hazmi flew to Beirut, though on separate flights and at different times. Al-Ghamdi flew on the same flight as a senior Hezbollah operative, although the 9/11 Commission could find no evidence that either knew the other. His family claims to have last seen him in December.

In March 2001, al-Ghamdi is reported to have met with a Jordanian in Connecticut who has been charged with providing false identification to at least 50 illegal aliens. Hijackers Majed Moqed, Hani Hanjour, and Nawaf al-Hazmi are reported to have met with him at the same time. Inexplicably, this is more than a month before al-Ghamdi first arrived in the United States, according to the FBI and the 9/11 Commission.

On May 2, al-Ghamdi moved from White Bear,  Minnesota and arrived in Pensacola, Florida with fellow-hijacker Majed Moqed, on a student visa. He listed the Naval Air Station in Pensacola, Florida as his permanent address on his driver's license. He and Moqed moved in with Hani Hanjour and Nawaf al-Hazmi in Falls Church, Virginia. All four later moved into an apartment in Paterson, New Jersey.

He called his parents in July 2001, but did not mention being in the United States.

Attacks 

His brother Hamza al-Ghamdi purchased Ghamdi's ticket online for United Airlines Flight 175 on August 29 or August 30, after buying his own.  He listed a Mail Boxes Etc. address for Ahmed al-Ghamdi.

The brothers stayed at the Charles Hotel in Cambridge, Massachusetts. On September 8, they checked out of the hotel, and moved into the Days Hotel on Soldiers Field Road in Brighton, where they remained up until the day of the attacks.

On the morning of September 11, 2001, Ahmed al-Ghamdi left the hotel with his brother, the two of them sharing a taxicab to get to Logan International Airport. There, al-Ghamdi showed his Virginia ID Card as identification, and boarded Flight 175 where he sat the furthest back of the hijackers, in seat 9D, helped to hijack it, and assisted as the plane crashed into the World Trade Center. The brothers pushed the passengers and crew to the back of the plane while Fayez Banihammad and Mohand al-Shehri killed the pilots Victor Saracini and Michael Horrocks allowing Marwan al-Shehhi to take control of the plane.

See also 
 Hijackers in the September 11 attacks
 PENTTBOM

References

External links 
 The Final 9/11 Commission Report
 news.bbc.co.uk

United Airlines Flight 175
2001 deaths
Saudi Arabian al-Qaeda members
Participants in the September 11 attacks
1979 births
Saudi Arabian mass murderers
Saudi Arabian murderers of children
Saudi Arabian expatriates in the United States
People from Al-Bahah Province